E76 may refer to:
 European route E76
 King's Indian Defence, Four Pawns Attack, Encyclopaedia of Chess Openings code
 Onomichi-Fukuyama Expressway, Nishiseto Expressway and Imabari-Komatsu Expressway, route E76 in Japan